A82 or A-82 may refer to:

 A82 road, a major road through the Scottish Highlands from Glasgow to Inverness via Fort William and Glen Coe
 Dutch Defence, in the Encyclopaedia of Chess Openings